William Raspberry (October 12, 1935 – July 17, 2012) was an American syndicated public affairs columnist. He was also the Knight Professor of the Practice of Communications and Journalism at the Sanford Institute of Public Policy at Duke University. An African American, he frequently wrote on racial issues.

In 1999, Raspberry received the Elijah Parish Lovejoy Award as well as an honorary Doctor of Laws degree from Colby College.

Career
After earning a B.S. in history at the University of Indianapolis in 1958, Raspberry continued to work at the local weekly Indianapolis Recorder where he had begun in 1956, rising to associate managing editor. He was drafted and served as a U.S. Army public information officer from 1960–1962. The Washington Post hired him as a teletypist in 1962. Raspberry quickly rose in the ranks of the paper, becoming a columnist in 1966. Raspberry was a finalist for the Pulitzer Prize in 1982, and won the Pulitzer Prize for Commentary in 1994.

Raspberry supported gay rights, writing at least one column condemning gay-bashing. He argued against certain torts and complaints from the disabled. Ragged Edge, a disabled-rights publication, published complaints from letters to the editor that the Post did not print.

Raspberry retired in December 2005. He provided the Washington Post a guest column on November 11, 2008, commenting on the election of Barack Obama as president of the United States.

As of 2008, he was president of "Baby Steps", a parent training and empowerment program based in Okolona, Mississippi. Raspberry was an alumnus of Okolona College.

He is the author of Looking Backward at Us, a collection of his columns from the 1980s.

Death
Raspberry died of prostate cancer on July 17, 2012, aged 76. He was buried at Rock Creek Cemetery.

References

External links

 William Raspberry's column in The Washington Post
 Raspberry's Duke University Homepage
  William Raspberry curriculum vitae dated 2008/08/12
 

1935 births
2012 deaths
African-American writers
African-American journalists
American columnists
Deaths from cancer in Washington, D.C.
Deaths from prostate cancer
Duke University faculty
Elijah Parish Lovejoy Award recipients
Pulitzer Prize for Commentary winners
The Washington Post people
People from Okolona, Mississippi
Writers from Indiana
Writers from Mississippi
University of Indianapolis alumni
Journalists from Mississippi
Burials at Rock Creek Cemetery
20th-century African-American people
21st-century African-American people